Mexico and the Philippines share a part of history dating from when the Philippines were under the administrative rule of the Viceroyalty of New Spain, modern Mexico, for the Spanish crown. Both nations are members of the Asia-Pacific Economic Cooperation, Association of Academies of the Spanish Language and the United Nations.

History

Mexico and the Philippines share some history from trade and commerce over 250 years. In 1521 Hernán Cortés conquered the Aztec Empire; and in the same year, Ferdinand Magellan travelled to Asia and claimed the Philippine islands for the Spanish crown. In 1543, after their discovery, the explorer Ruy López de Villalobos sailed from Barra de Navidad, Jalisco, Mexico, to recognize and name these islands. They were named the Philippine Islands, in honor of Prince Felipe of Asturias.

In 1565, Spanish Governor General Miguel Lopez de Legazpi claimed the Philippines as a Spanish trading post and designated Manila as its capital in 1571. Due to its distance from Spain, the Spanish Government assigned Manila's administration and government to the Viceroyalty of New Spain for two and a half centuries. Evangelization and commercialization constituted the core of intercontinental ties between Asia and America that materialized with the Manila-Acapulco galleons trade.

Due to this exchange with the Philippines, some Mexicans and Spaniards remained in the Philippines, and some Filipinos in Mexico, particularly the central west coast, near the port town of Acapulco. Many Nahuatl words were adopted and popularized in the Philippines, such as Tianggui (market fair) and Zapote (a fruit).

Philippines under the Viceroyalty of New Spain
The Philippines was proclaimed a Spanish territory in 1565, when Miguel Lopez de Legazpi was appointed Governor General. He selected Manila as the capital in 1571. The islands were very remote, so the Spanish Crown ordered the islands to be administered from the kingdom of the Viceroyalty of New Spain based in Mexico City for over two and half centuries.

Hence many of the governors of the Philippines were Mexican-Creole. The army was recruited from all the populations of New Spain, which led to ethnic and cultural mingling between multiple groups. Evangelization and commerce connected America and Asia, exemplified by the galleon trade. The trade between Canton and Acapulco passed through Manila, where Chinese ships came laden with silks and porcelain to be sent to America, in exchange for silver. And the exchange of ideas accompanied the exchange of products.

Independent relationships
 Mexicans were among those involved with the Philippines-born soldier Andres Novales and his 1823 uprising against Spain. On the Mexican side, Philippines-born Ramón Fabié had supported Miguel Hidalgo in the Mexican War of Independence. In 1842, after the colonial period, Mexico stationed an independent representative in Manila. However, the earliest reference to a Mexican diplomat in the Philippines is found during the Revolution, in the Porfiriato, with the appointment, in 1878, of Evaristo Hernandez Butler, as Consul.

During World War II, Mexico participated in the Pacific campaign against Japan and sent the 201 Squadron, with a contingent of the Mexican Expeditionary Air Force, which arrived in Manila on 30 April 1945, commanded by Colonel Antonio Cardenas Rodriguez. The Mexican air force participated in the Battle of Luzon.

After Philippine independence

The independence of the Philippines brought forth a new era of relations between these countries. Mexico dispatched an envoy to participate in the festivities to celebrate the birth of the Southeast Asian nation. Diplomatic ties between both countries were formalized on 14 April 1953. The year of 1964 was decreed the "Year of Philippine-Mexican Friendship" to celebrate the Fourth Centennial of the expedition of Miguel López de Legazpi. In modern day, the conquest of the Philippines is seen as a Spanish initiative, while Mexico is viewed as a country of historical link and friendship, and several groups intend on strengthening the bond between the two countries.

The Philippine Legation in Mexico opened its doors, with Carlos Gutiérrez Macias, as Minister Extraordinary and Plenipotentiary, on 17 September 1953. It was elevated to the rank of an embassy on 25 July 1961. That same year, Mexico opened an embassy in Manila.

High-level visits

During the presidency of Diosdado Macapagal, the President of Mexico, Adolfo López Mateos, paid a state visit to the Philippines from October 20 to 23, 1962, to respond to the trip to Mexico in 1960, by then Vice President Macapagal. The year 1964 was designated the Year of the Mexican-Filipino Friendship to celebrate the fourth centenary of the expedition of Miguel López de Legazpi.

President Gloria Macapagal Arroyo visited Mexico on 21 November 2001 to attend the international conference of the Christian Democratic parties, at which President Vicente Fox represented Mexico. President Arroyo was the guest of Mexico during the Tenth APEC Leaders Meeting held in La Paz, Baja California in October 2002.

In November 2011, former Mexican First Lady Margarita Zavala made a two-day special visit to the Philippines. Margarita Zavala met the Philippine President in the Malacañang Palace. She also visited Fort Santiago and the Nayong Kabataan shelter for children.

Mexican President Enrique Peña Nieto made a visit to the Philippines on 17 November 2015 on during the APEC Economic Leaders' Meeting in Manila. During his visit, President Peña Nieto and Philippine President Benigno Aquino III discussed enhancing trade relations and witnessed the signing of bilateral agreements on the avoidance of double taxation, tourism cooperation, and combating illegal drug trade.

List of high-level visits

 Presidential visits from Mexico to the Philippines

 President Adolfo López Mateos (October 1962)
 President José López Portillo (November 1978)
 President Ernesto Zedillo (November 1996)
 President Enrique Peña Nieto (November 2015)

 Presidential visits from the Philippines to Mexico

 President Ferdinand Marcos (October 1981)
 President Fidel V. Ramos (May 1997)
 President Gloria Macapagal Arroyo (November 2001 & October 2002)

Bilateral agreements signed
To date, Mexico and the Philippines have signed the following agreements:
 Bilateral Air Transport Agreement, signed in 1952.
 Cultural Agreement signed in Mexico in 1969.
 Agreement on Scientific-Technical Cooperation in Agricultural Matters, signed in 1994
 Agreement on Cooperation in the Field of Tourism in 1995.
 Visa Abolition Agreement ordinary, signed in 1997.
 Agreement on Cooperation in Combating Illicit Trafficking and Abuse of Narcotic Drugs.
 Basic Agreement on Technical and Scientific Cooperation in 1997.
 Psychotropic Substances and Precursors Control, signed in 1997.
 Memorandum of Understanding on Academic Cooperation between the Secretariat of Foreign Affairs of Mexico and the Department of Foreign Affairs of the Philippines, signed in 1997.

In February 2012, Philippine Foreign Secretary Albert Del Rosario signed two bilateral agreements with Mexican Foreign Minister Patricia Espinosa in Mexico. These agreements include establishing a Joint Bilateral Consultation Meeting and providing for the exchange of information, training modules, and scholars for diplomatic training.

Trade and commerce

In 2018, two-way trade between both nations amounted to US$2.9 billion. Mexico's main export products to the Philippines include: copper ores and concentrates; memory units; tequila; alcoholic beverages; generators of radio, audio, video or stereo signals; special acoustic effects generators; motor boats; control units or adapters; and modular circuits. The Philippines main export products to Mexico include: memory units; photovoltaic solar cells; harness; voltage sources; goods for the Sector Promotion Program of the Automotive and Auto Parts Industry; modular circuits; and crude oil.

Mexico is the third largest importer from the Philippines in the Americas (after the United States and Canada) and is the seventh largest exporter to the Philippines. Mexican multinational company Cemex operates in the Philippines.

UNESCO Partnership
In late 2014, the idea to nominate the Manila–Acapulco Galleon Trade Route was initiated by the Mexican ambassador to UNESCO with the Filipino ambassador to UNESCO after a meeting between the two sides during a documentary showing of the galleons was held in Cuernavaca, Mexico.

An Experts' Roundtable Meeting was held at the University of Santo Tomas (UST) on 23 April 2015 as part of the preparation of the Philippines for the possible transnational nomination of the Manila–Acapulco Galleon Trade Route to the World Heritage List. The nomination will be made jointly with Mexico. The meeting focused on the tornaviaje, shipyards in the Bicol region, underwater archaeology, maps and cartography, fortifications in the Philippines, food, textile, and historical dimension. The papers presented and discussed during the roundtable meeting will be synthesized into a working document to establish the route's outstanding universal value. The Mexican side reiterated that they will also follow suit with the preparations for the route's nomination. Spain has also backed the nomination of the route in the World Heritage List and has also suggested the archives related to the route under the possession of the Philippines, Mexico, and Spain to be nominated as part of another UNESCO list, the Memory of the World Register.

The Galeón: Manila–Acapulco Galleon Museum, or Museo de Galleon, had its soft opening in the capital of the Philippines in 2017. The huge museum is a prestigious exhibition and research center on the history of globalization, through the lens of the galleon trade, and thus from the Philippine and Mexican puntos de vista. Various areas of the museum are still being constructed and expanded.

Resident diplomatic missions

 Mexico has an embassy in Manila
 Philippines has an embassy in Mexico City

See also
 Embassy of the Philippines, Mexico City
 Filipino immigration to Mexico
 Mexican settlement in the Philippines

References

 
Philippines
Bilateral relations of the Philippines